Dianne Evelyn Wiest (born March 28, 1948) is an American actress. She has won two Academy Awards for Best Supporting Actress for 1986’s Hannah and Her Sisters and 1994’s Bullets over Broadway (both of which were directed by Woody Allen), one Golden Globe Award for Bullets over Broadway, the 1997 Primetime Emmy Award for Outstanding Guest Actress in a Drama Series for Road to Avonlea, and the 2008 Primetime Emmy Award for Outstanding Supporting Actress in a Drama Series for In Treatment. In addition, she was nominated for an Academy Award for 1989’s Parenthood.

Other film appearances by Wiest include Footloose (1984); Woody Allen's The Purple Rose of Cairo (1985), Radio Days (1987), and September (1987); The Lost Boys (1987), Bright Lights, Big City (1988), Edward Scissorhands (1990), Little Man Tate (1991), The Birdcage (1996), Practical Magic (1998), Dan in Real Life (2007), Synecdoche, New York (2008), Rabbit Hole (2010), Sisters (2015), Let Them All Talk (2020) and I Care a Lot (2020). She also appeared in the television series Law & Order (2000–02), and the CBS comedy Life in Pieces (2015–2019).

Early life
Wiest was born in Kansas City, Missouri. Her mother, Anne Stewart (née Keddie), was a nurse. Her father, Bernard John Wiest, was a college dean and former psychiatric social worker for the U.S. Army. Her mother was Scottish, from Auchtermuchty, while her father was an American of Croatian and German descent. They met in Algiers. Wiest has two brothers, Greg and Don. Her ambition was to be a ballet dancer, but she switched her goal to theater in her senior year at Nurnberg American High School. Wiest graduated from the University of Maryland in 1969 with a degree in Arts and Sciences.

Career

Stage

Wiest studied theater at the University of Maryland, leaving after her third term to tour with a Shakespearean troupe. Later, she had a supporting role in a New York Shakespeare Festival production of Ashes. She also acted at the Yale Repertory Theatre in New Haven, Connecticut, playing the title role in Henrik Ibsen's Hedda Gabler. She was an understudy both off-Broadway and on Broadway, in Kurt Vonnegut's Happy Birthday, Wanda June in 1970.

She made her Broadway debut in Robert Anderson's Solitaire/Double Solitaire, taking over in the role of the daughter in 1971. She landed a four-year job as a member of the Arena Stage in Washington, D.C., in such roles as Emily in Our Town, Honey in Who's Afraid of Virginia Woolf?, and leading roles in S. Ansky's The Dybbuk, Maxim Gorky's The Lower Depths and George Bernard Shaw's Heartbreak House. She toured the USSR with the Arena Stage.
In 1976, Wiest attended the Eugene O'Neill National Playwrights Conference and starred in leading roles in Amlin Gray's Pirates and Christopher Durang's A History of the American Film. At Joe Papp's Public Theater she took over the lead in Ashes, and played Cassandra in Agamemnon, directed by Andrei Șerban. In 1979, she originated the role of Agnes in Agnes of God in its first production in Waterford, Connecticut.

She appeared in two plays by Tina Howe: Museum and The Art of Dining. In the latter, Wiest's performance as the shy and awkward author Elizabeth Barrow Colt won three off-Broadway theater awards: an Obie Award (1980), a Theatre World Award (1979–1980), and the Clarence Derwent Award (1980), given yearly for the most promising performance in New York theatre.

On Broadway she appeared in Frankenstein (1981), directed by Tom Moore, portrayed Desdemona in Othello (1982) opposite James Earl Jones and Christopher Plummer and co-starred with John Lithgow in Christopher Durang's romantic screwball comedy Beyond Therapy (1982), directed by John Madden. (She played opposite Lithgow again in the Herbert Ross film Footloose). During the 1980s, she also performed in Hedda Gabler, directed by Lloyd Richards at Yale Repertory Theatre, and in Harold Pinter's A Kind of Alaska (1984, Manhattan Theatre Club), Lanford Wilson's Serenading Louie (1984), and Janusz Glowacki's Hunting Cockroaches (1987, Manhattan Theater Club).
As Wiest became established as a film actress through her work in Woody Allen's films, she was less frequently available for stage roles. However, she did appear onstage during the 1990s, in In the Summer House, Square One, Cynthia Ozick's The Shawl, and Naomi Wallace's One Flea Spare. In 2003, she appeared with Al Pacino and Marisa Tomei in Oscar Wilde's Salome. In 2005, she starred in Kathleen Tolan's Memory House. She also starred in a production of Wendy Wasserstein's final play Third (directed by Daniel Sullivan) at Lincoln Center.

Later New York theater roles include performances as Arkadina in an off-Broadway revival of The Seagull (opposite Alan Cumming's Trigorin) and as Kate Keller in a Broadway revival of Arthur Miller's All My Sons, opposite John Lithgow, Patrick Wilson, and Katie Holmes. In 2009, Wiest appeared in the National Memorial Day Concert on the Mall in Washington, D.C. in a dialogue with Katie Holmes celebrating the life of an American veteran seriously wounded in Iraq, José Pequeño.
Wiest spent September 2010 as a visiting teacher at Columbia University's Graduate Acting Program, working with a group of 18 first-year MFA Acting students on selected plays by Anton Chekhov and Arthur Miller.

In 2016 she took on the role of "Winnie" in The Yale Repertory Theatre's production of Samuel Beckett's, Happy Days. She reprised the role for Theatre for a New Audience in downtown Brooklyn, New York, in the spring of 2017 and the Mark Taper Forum in Los Angeles in 2019.

Film and television
Her early screen roles include small roles in It's My Turn (credited onscreen as Diane Wiest) and I'm Dancing as Fast as I Can, both starring Jill Clayburgh in the lead roles. In 1984, she starred in Footloose, as the reverend's wife and Ariel's mother.

Under Woody Allen's direction, Wiest won an Academy Award for Best Supporting Actress for Hannah and Her Sisters in 1987 and Bullets over Broadway in 1995. She also appeared in three other Woody Allen films: The Purple Rose of Cairo (1985), Radio Days (1987) and September (1987).

She followed her first Oscar success with performances in The Lost Boys (1987) and Bright Lights, Big City (1988). She also starred with Steve Martin, Mary Steenburgen, Jason Robards, Keanu Reeves and Martha Plimpton in Ron Howard's Parenthood, for which she received her second Oscar nomination.
Other major film roles include Tim Burton's Edward Scissorhands (1990), Jodie Foster's Little Man Tate (1991) and The Birdcage (1996), Mike Nichols' remake of La Cage aux Folles.

On television, her performance on the series Road to Avonlea in 1989 brought her her first Emmy Award for Outstanding Guest Actress in a Dramatic Series. She received another nomination for her performance in the 1999 telefilm The Simple Life of Noah Dearborn, co-starring Sidney Poitier. She starred in the television mini-series The 10th Kingdom in 2000.
From 2000 to 2002, Wiest portrayed interim District Attorney Nora Lewin in the long-running NBC crime drama Law & Order. She also played the character in two episodes of Law & Order: Special Victims Unit and the pilot episode of Law & Order: Criminal Intent.

Wiest starred alongside Steve Carell and Juliette Binoche in Dan in Real Life (2007) and had a key supporting role in Charlie Kaufman's 2008 film Synecdoche, New York.

In 2008, she appeared as Gabriel Byrne's therapist, Gina Toll, on the HBO television series In Treatment, for which she received her second Emmy Award, for Outstanding Supporting Actress in a Drama Series. She received another nomination (in the same category) for the second season, in 2009, but did not win.

She starred alongside Nicole Kidman in Rabbit Hole (2010), which debuted at the Toronto International Film Festival. Wiest also co-starred in Lawrence Kasdan's 2012 comedy Darling Companion, alongside Kevin Kline and Diane Keaton. In 2020, Wiest starred in Steven Soderbergh's drama Let Them All Talk alongside Meryl Streep, and Candice Bergen. That same year she also starred opposite Rosamund Pike in the action thriller I Care a Lot.

Personal life
Wiest was in a relationship with her talent agent Sam Cohn for three years in the mid-1980s. She adopted two daughters: Emily and Lily.

Filmography

Film

Television

Stage

Awards and honors

Wiest has been nominated for three Academy Awards for Best Supporting Actress receiving two wins for her performances in the Woody Allen films Hannah and Her Sisters (1986) and Bullets over Broadway (1994). She has received four Primetime Emmy Award nominations for her work on television, winning two awards for Road to Avonlea (1996) and In Treatment (2008). She has also received two Golden Globe Award nominations and two Screen Actors Guild Award nominations.

References

External links

20th-century American actresses
21st-century American actresses
1948 births
Living people
Actresses from Kansas City, Missouri
American film actresses
American people of Croatian descent
American people of German descent
American people of Scottish descent
American stage actresses
American television actresses
Best Supporting Actress Academy Award winners
Best Supporting Actress Golden Globe (film) winners
Clarence Derwent Award winners
Independent Spirit Award for Best Supporting Female winners
Obie Award recipients
Outstanding Performance by a Cast in a Motion Picture Screen Actors Guild Award winners
Outstanding Performance by a Female Actor in a Supporting Role Screen Actors Guild Award winners
Outstanding Performance by a Supporting Actress in a Drama Series Primetime Emmy Award winners
Sundance Film Festival award winners
University of Maryland, College Park alumni